This article is a list of notable individuals who were born in and/or have lived in Golden, Colorado.

Academia

 John C. Bailar, Jr. (1904–1991), chemist
 Anthony R. Barringer (1925–2009), geophysicist
 Edward L. Berthoud (1828–1908), engineer, historian, Mayor of Golden, Colorado state legislator
 Vine Deloria, Jr. (1933–2005), American Indian activist, theologian
 Dennis Robert Hoagland (1884–1949), botanist
 Arthur Lakes (1844–1917), geologist
 Robert W. Richardson (1910–2007), railroad historian

Arts and entertainment

Film, television, and theatre
 Johnny Hines (1895–1970), actor
Shayla LaVeaux, adult film actress 
 Pete Morrison (1890–1973), actor

Journalism
 Edgar Watson Howe (1853–1937), newspaper editor, novelist

Literature
 Francine Mathews (1963– ), novelist

Music
 Matt Pike (1972– ), guitarist, singer

Other visual arts
 Gertrude Käsebier (1852–1934), photographer
 David Uhl (1961– ), painter

Business
 Adolph Coors (1847–1929), brewer
 Adolph Coors II (1884–1970), brewing executive
 Joseph Coors (1917–2003), brewing executive
 Pete Coors (1946– ), brewing executive
 Bill Harmsen (1912–2002), candy maker
 Dorothy Harmsen (1914–2006), candy maker
 William A. H. Loveland (1826–1894), railroad entrepreneur
 Bill Phillips (1964– ), fitness entrepreneur, bodybuilder
 George Pullman (1831–1897), engineer, rail car manufacturer
 Samuel M. Reed (1901–1996), drive-in speaker entrepreneur

Military
 Dale Gardner (1948–2014), U.S. Navy Captain, astronaut

Politics

National
 Holly Coors (1920–2009), conservative political activist
 George E. Spencer (1836–1893), U.S. Senator from Alabama

State
 Brian Boatright (1962– ), Colorado Supreme Court justice
 Alexander Cummings (1810–1879), 3rd Governor of Colorado Territory
 William L. Douglas (1845–1924), 42nd Governor of Massachusetts
 John Frullo (1962– ), Texas state legislator
 Frank B. Morrison (1905–2004), 31st Governor of Nebraska
 William Grover Smith (1857–1921), 6th Lieutenant Governor of Colorado
 John Charles Vivian (1887–1964), 30th Governor of Colorado

Religion
 Frances Xavier Cabrini (1850–1917), Catholic missionary and saint
 George Randall (1810–1873), Episcopal Bishop

Sports

Baseball
 Roy Hartzell (1881–1961), infielder, outfielder
 Cowboy Jones (1874–1958), pitcher
 Keli McGregor (1963–2010), president of Colorado Rockies, football tight end
 Mark Melancon (1985– ), pitcher
 Steve Reed (1965– ), pitcher

Track and field
 Brianne Nelson (1980– ), distance runner
 Tyler Pennel (1987– ), distance runner

Other
 Gudy Gaskill (1927–2016), mountaineer, developer of the Colorado Trail
 Lindsey Horan (1994– ), soccer forward, midfielder
 Alex Howes (1988– ), cyclist
 Elwood Romney (1911–1970), basketball forward, coach
 Jarret Thomas (1981– ), U.S. Olympic snowboarder

References

Golden, Colorado
Golden
People from Golden, Colorado